Dave Mazzoni (born October 31, 1979) is an American film director, producer, and screenwriter.

Early life
Mazzoni was born and grew up in Philadelphia. Dave Mazzoni and Tom Mattera teamed up during childhood in Philadelphia where they began their creative collaboration on film. Their first screenplay, Mectl, was selected as one of the top 250 out of 5,500 submissions in HBO’s Project Greenlight Competition in 2003.cousin of Craig Rettershofer.

Mazzoni graduated with a B.A. in Film and Media Arts in 2004 from Temple University, where he studied underneath award winning filmmaker Eugene Martin (Edge City, Diary of a City Priest). Mazzoni also studied Management Information Systems at Drexel University prior to receiving his film degree.

Features

The 4th Dimension
Dave Mazzoni directed his first feature film with Tom Mattera, The 4th Dimension, in 2006. The film depicts Jack is a loner confined to a workbench in the back of an antique shop. When a mysterious woman presents him with a broken antique clock that is not to be fixed, unexplainable events begin to occur. After finding Albert Einstein's journal on his still unsolved Unified Field Theory, Jack becomes obsessed with analyzing time and theorizing its connection to his supernatural experiences, his surreal dreams, and his perception of reality, only to lead to the discovery of the biggest mystery of all - himself. Mattera and Mazzoni made the film for just $75,000. The film  won the Grand Jury Honorable Mention Award at CineVegas in 2006, the Technical Achievement Award at the Philadelphia Film Festival, and went on to screen at over 20 international film festivals.

The Fields
Mazzoni and Mattera recently directed their second independent feature, The Fields, a thriller starring Academy Award winner Cloris Leachman and Tara Reid, which is scheduled for a 2011 release. The film takes place in a small Pennsylvania town in 1973, and tells the story of a young boy and his family as they are terrorized by an unseen presence in the surrounding fields. The film is being produced by Faust Checho with Mr. Big Productions, in association with MazWa Productions. Tommy Lee Wallace is attached as an associate producer. Production spanned six weeks, throughout September and October 2009, and was shot 100% on location in the Pocono Mountains region in Kunkletown Pennsylvania.

Directorial style
Mazzoni and Mattera's film The 4th Dimension has been compared to the works of David Lynch and Darren Aronofsky.

Filmography

References

1979 births
Living people
American film directors
American film producers
American male screenwriters